Nasirnagar is an upazila of Brahmanbaria District in the Division of Chittagong, Bangladesh.

Geography
It has 40,917 households and a total area of 311.66 km2.

Demographics
According to the 1991 Bangladesh census, Nasirnagar had a population of 234,090. Males constituted 50.45% of the population, and females 49.55%. The population aged 18 or over was 114,601. Nasirnagar had an average literacy rate of 19.3% (7+ years), against the national average of 32.4%.

Administration
Nasirnagar Upazila is divided into 13 union parishads: Burishwar, Bhalakut, Chapartala, Chatalpar, Dharmondol, Fandauk, Goalnagar, Gokarna, Goniauk, Haripur, Kunda, Nasirnagar, and Purbabhag. The union parishads are subdivided into 96 mauzas and 128 villages.

Chairman: Rafiuddin Ahmed

Vice Chairman: Syed Fazle Yeaz Al Hossain

Woman Vice Chairman: Robina Aktar

Upazila Nirbahi Officer (UNO): Nazma Ashrafi

See also
Upazilas of Bangladesh
Districts of Bangladesh
Divisions of Bangladesh

References

Upazilas of Brahmanbaria District